San Antonio de Guerra is a municipality (municipio) of the Santo Domingo province in the Dominican Republic. Within the municipality there is one municipal district (distrito municipal): Hato Viejo.

For comparison with other municipalities and municipal districts see the list of municipalities and municipal districts of the Dominican Republic.

References

Populated places in Santo Domingo Province
Municipalities of the Dominican Republic